The Ahlström family is a Finnish family of industrialists, designers and artists. They are known for being the founding family behind the Ahlstrom Corporation and for their cooperation with Alvar Aalto. Jussi Ahlström, the son of a Swedish allotment soldier and the ancestor of the Ahlström family, was from Naistenmatka, the village of Pirkkala.

Notable members
 Antti Ahlström, founder of the A. Ahlström company
 Eva Ahlström CEO of A. Ahlström, first female CEO in Finland
 Walter Ahlström, CEO of A. Ahlström, son of Antti
 Rafael Ahlström, son of Antti
 Wilhelm Ahlström, son of Antti
 Hans Ahlström, CEO of A. Ahlström
 Maire Gullichsen (née Ahlström, 1907–1990), daughter of Walter, founder of Artek, resident at Villa Mairea
 Harry Gullichsen, CEO of A. Ahlström, husband of Maire
 Krister Ahlström, CEO of A. Ahlström
 Kristian Valter Gullichsen (born 1932), son of Harry & Maire, architect in the company Gullichsen Kairamo Vormala
 Johan Gullichsen, professor and a chairman of the board of directors of A. Ahlström, son of Harry & Maire
 Lilli Alanen, philosopher and professor, daughter of Harry & Maire
 Alvar Gullichsen (born 1961), artist known for his spoof Bonk Business Inc., son of Kristian
 Johanna Gullichsen, textile designer
 Sam Huber, musician and actor

See also
Ahlstrom
List of Bilderberg attendees
Millennium Technology Prize

References

External links
 Maire Gullichsen (1907–1990)
 Gullichsen Maire at the YLE site (in Finnish)
 Bonk Museum 

Finnish families